Data Panik (stylized as data Panik) were a Scottish rock band—Steven Clark (Sci-fi Steven), John Clark (John Disco), Amanda MacKinnon (Manda Rin) (all formerly of bis at the time), Stuart Memo (of Multiplies) and Graham Christie (ex Kenickie tour drummer).

Their debut single, "Cubis (I Love You)" backed with "Sense Not Sense" was released on limited edition 7-inch and download in June 2005.

In October 2005, data Panik became the first band in the UK to have a dedicated mobile i-mode website.

April 2006 saw the release of a split 7-inch single on Must Destroy Records with fellow Scots :( (pronounced colon open bracket). The data Panik track "Control The Radical" is featured.

The group recorded three songs for XFM Scotland ("Minimum Wage", "Retail of the Details" and "Do The Static") which were played on-air the evening of Wednesday 7 June 2006.

It was announced on 16 August 2006 that data Panik had decided to split on the premise that people would not accept them as a credible post bis band. All members are intending to concentrate on solo projects with John and Steven continuing their Dirty Hospital project.

Some songs by the band were later released on the album data Panik etcetera by bis in 2014.

External links
Audiojunkies Interview with Manda Rin

Scottish rock music groups